Viktors Ignatjevs (born April 26, 1970 in Riga, Soviet Union) is a Latvian former ice hockey player who played 11 games in the National Hockey League with the Pittsburgh Penguins. Currently Ignatjevs works as the assistant coach in Dinamo Riga of the Kontinental Hockey League. He has a wife Lena and three daughters: Lisa, Kristina, and Sonja. Lisa and Kristina were born in the United States.

Career statistics

Regular season and playoffs

International

External links

1970 births
Living people
Denver Grizzlies players
Dinamo Riga players
EHC Black Wings Linz players
Expatriate ice hockey players in Russia
HC Spartak Moscow players
Ice hockey players at the 2002 Winter Olympics
Kansas City Blades players
Latvian expatriate sportspeople in the United States
Latvian ice hockey coaches
Latvian ice hockey defencemen
Latvian sports coaches
Leksands IF players
Long Beach Ice Dogs (IHL) players
Nürnberg Ice Tigers players
Oklahoma City Blazers (1992–2009) players
Olympic ice hockey players of Latvia
Pittsburgh Penguins players
Sacramento River Rats players
San Jose Sharks draft picks
Severstal Cherepovets players
Ice hockey people from Riga
Soviet ice hockey players
Utah Grizzlies (AHL) players
Vienna Capitals players